Theodore Nisbet Gibbs (3 February 1896–15 July 1978) was a New Zealand law clerk, accountant, businessman and tax adviser. He was born in Whangaroa, Northland, New Zealand on 3 February 1896.

References

1896 births
1978 deaths
20th-century New Zealand businesspeople
People from the Northland Region
New Zealand accountants